Kartika Deepam is a festival of lights that is observed mainly by Hindu Tamils, and also by adherents in the regions of Kerala, Andhra Pradesh, Telangana, Karnataka, and Sri Lanka. Celebrated in Tamilakam since the ancient period, the festival is held on the full moon day of the Kartika (கார்த்திகை) month, called the Kartika Pournami, falling on the Gregorian months of November or December. It is marked on the day the full moon is in conjunction with the constellation of Kartika. It corresponds to the occasion of the Kartika Purnima, though it falls on a different day due to the correction of equinoxes in the Tamil calendar.

In Kerala, this festival is known as Trikkartika, celebrated in the honour of Chottanikkara Bhagavati, a form of Lakshmi. It is celebrated in the name of Lakshabba in the Nilgiris district of Tamil Nadu.

History
One of the earliest references to the festival is found in the Akanaṉūṟu, a book of poems, which dates back to the Sangam period (200 BCE to 300 CE). The text states that Kartika is celebrated on the purnima of the month of Kārtikai in the Tamil calendar. Avvaiyar, a renowned poet of this period, refers to the festival in her songs. Kārtikai tīpam is one of the oldest festivals celebrated by Tamil people. The festival finds reference in Sangam literature like the Akanaṉūṟu and the poems of Avvaiyar. Kārtikai is referred in the Sangam literature as Peruviḻa.

Legend

Story of the six stars 
In Hindu mythology, some legends state that the deity Shiva created Kartikeya (Murugan) from his third eye, or his six primary faces (tatpurusam, aghoram, sadyojātam, vāmadevam, iśānam, and adhómukham). It is believed that these six faces transformed into six children, and each of them brought up by six Kartika nymphs (Śiva, Sambhūti, Prīti, Sannati, Anasūya, and Kṣamā, sometimes also rendered Dula, Nitatni, Abhrayanti, Varshayanti, Meghayanti, and Chipunika), later merged into one by his mother, Parvati. These six nymphs are regarded to represent the cluster of six stars that make up the Kartika constellation.

As the six nymphs had helped in rearing the child, Shiva is said to have bestowed immortality upon the six nymphs, created to become eternal stars in the sky. Any worship performed to these six stars is regarded to be equal to worshiping Murugan himself, and are hence sacred to Shaivas. They are worshiped by lighting up rows of oil lamps (deepam) in the evening of the festival day around houses and streets. Kartika Deepam is also celebrated as the birthday of Kartikeya.

Jyotirlinga

According to a Shaiva legend, Shiva once appeared as an endless flame of light before the deities Vishnu and Brahma, both of whom considered themselves to be the supreme deity. Shiva declared that the dispute would be resolved if the two could discover his head and feet. Vishnu took the form of a boar (Varaha) and descended to locate his feet, while Brahma rode his swan (Hamsa) to locate his head. Vishnu failed in his search of the feet and returned, honest about the outcome of his quest. But Brahma, chancing upon a piece of tāḻampū flower, and learnt from it that it had been floating down for thirty-thousand years from Shiva's head. He seized upon this flower and claimed to Shiva that he had seen the deity's head. Shiva realised the falsehood and pronounced that there would never be a temple for Brahma in this world. He also interdicted the use of the aforementioned flower in his worship. To honour Shiva's appearance as the jyotirlinga, this day is called Kārtikai mahatīpam in Tamil (Great lamp of the month of Kārtikai).

Celebrations
 Rows of Agal vilakkus (clay oil lamps) are lit in the houses of adherents in celebration of this festival, considered to be auspicious symbols. It is believed to ward off evil forces, and usher in prosperity and joy. This festival is also celebrated to commemorate the bonding between brothers and sisters in South India (analogous to Raksha Bandhan). Sisters pray for the prosperity and success of their brothers, and light lamps to mark the occasion.
In Telugu households, the Kartika masam (month) is considered to be auspicious. Starting on the day of Deepavali and till the end of the month, oil lamps are lit every day, according to tradition. 

On the occasion of Kartikai Pournami (full moon of the Kārtikai month) oil lamps with 365 wicks, prepared at home, are lit in Shiva temples. In some households, fasting is observed till sunset, every day for the whole month.

Regional traditions

Thiruvannamalai 
In the town of Thiruvannamalai, the festival is marked by the lighting of the Thiruvannamali Maha Deepam. A massive earthen lamp is lit around 6 PM at the top of the 2668 feet high holy mountain of the town. The entire mountain is regarded by devotees to be a representation of a Shiva Linga. Nearly 3500 kilograms of ghee are used to light this lamp. Devotees believe that the form of Shiva named Ardhanarishvara would bless them in the temple at the time of the lighting the Maha Deepam. The light emitted from the mountain is visible up to a radius of 35 KM. Hundreds of thousands of devotees perform the 16 km girivalam, the circumambulation of the sacred mountain. The mai, the ash that remains as residue after the lighting of the ghee is distributed as prasadam to devotees on the Margali Arudra Darisanam day.

Sri Lanka 
As in Tiruvannamalai, Tamil Nadu, the Kartika festival is also famous in Koneshwaram, Trincomalee, Sri Lanka. The festival is celebrated for three days. The first day is called Appa Kartika, the second Vadai Kartika, and the final day is called Thiru Kartika, widely considered as the Kartika day, when the main pooja is performed. On the Kartika day, a huge fire lamp is lit up on the hill (in both temples), visible for several kilometers around. The fire (deepam) is called Mahadeepam. Hindu devotees visit the place, to pray and make offerings to Shiva.

Notes

References

External links 

Hindu holy days
Tamil festivals
Festivals in Tamil Nadu
Fireworks events in Asia
November observances
December observances